Socket FM2 is a CPU socket used by AMD's desktop Trinity and Richland APUs to connect to the motherboard as well as Athlon X2 and Athlon X4 processors based on them. FM2 was launched on September 27, 2012. Motherboards which feature the at the time new FM2 CPU socket also utilize AMD's at the time new A85X chipset.

The socket is very similar to FM1, based on a 31 × 31 grid of pins with a 5 × 7 central void, three pins missing from each corner, and a few additional key pins missing. Compared to Socket FM1, two key pins were moved, and one more is removed, leaving 904 pins.

For available chipsets consult Fusion controller hubs (FCH).

Steamroller-based "Kaveri" APUs are not supported, see Socket FM2+ (FM2r2) and Socket FP3 (BGA-???).

Heatsink 
The four holes for fastening the heatsink to the motherboard are placed in a rectangle with lateral lengths of 48 mm and 96 mm for AMD's sockets Socket AM2, Socket AM2+, Socket AM3, Socket AM3+ and Socket FM2. Cooling solutions should therefore be interchangeable.

Feature overview

External links 

 
 

AMD sockets